Do Not Say It's Not Your Country is a collection of twelve short stories by Nigerian author Nnamdi Oguike and published by Griots Lounge in 2019. The collection contains twelve stories, each set in a different African country. It has been compared favourably to Uwem Akpan's Say You're One of Them by Brittle Paper. In 2019, it won the Miles Morland Foundation Writing Scholarship.

References 

2019 short story collections
Nigerian short story collections